Lee High School is a high school in Wyoming, Michigan (U.S.) that is part of the Godfrey-Lee Public Schools school district.

Demographics
The demographic breakdown of the 524 students enrolled in 2021–22 was:
Boys - 54.6%
Girls - 45.4%
Black - 7.8%
Hispanic - 84.2%
White - 5.7%
Multiracial - 2.3%

91.4% of the students were eligible for free or reduced-cost lunch.

Athletics 
The Lee Legends compete in the Ottawa-Kent Conference Silver Division. The school colors are Navy Blue and Vegas Gold. The following Michigan High School Athletic Association (MHSAA) sanctioned sports are offered:

Baseball (boys)
Basketball (girls and boys)
Bowling (girls and boys)
Competitive Cheer (girls)
Cross Country (girls and boys) 
Boys State Champion - 1971, 1972, 1978
Girls State Champion  - 1981
Football (boys)
Soccer (girls and boys)
Softball (girls)
Tennis (girls)
Boys State Champion  - 1953, 1954 (3-way tie)
Track and field (girls and boys) 
Volleyball (girls) 
Wrestling (boys)

References

External links 

Public high schools in Michigan
Educational institutions established in 1923
Schools in Kent County, Michigan
1923 establishments in Michigan